Egon Schein (20 January 1912 in Kiel – 14 February 1977 in Hamburg) was a German athlete who competed in the 1936 Summer Olympics.

Competition record

References

1912 births
1977 deaths
German male sprinters
Olympic athletes of Germany
Athletes (track and field) at the 1936 Summer Olympics
Sportspeople from Kiel
European Athletics Championships medalists